Changabad-e Jadid (also Romanized as Changābād-e Jadīd; also known as Changābād and Jangābād) is a village in Jamrud Rural District, in the Central District of Torbat-e Jam County, Razavi Khorasan Province, Iran. At the 2006 census, its population was 59, in 12 families.

References 

Populated places in Torbat-e Jam County